Beechwood School is a coeducational secondary school and sixth form located in the Britwell area of Slough, Berkshire, England.

The school was established in 1982 when the former Haymill and Warren Field Secondary schools merged on the Warren Field site.

Ofsted in 2008 judged the school to be Good. In 2016 it was judged as Requires Improvement. Following that inspection the school converted to an academy.

Notes and references

Secondary schools in Slough
Educational institutions established in 1982
1982 establishments in England
Academies in Slough